The Bradford Exchange is an American producer and seller of collectible goods, jewelry, sports memorabilia and apparel. Now part of the Bradford Group, it was founded in 1973 as The Bradford Gallery of Collector's Plates by J. Roderick MacArthur. The company created its first live price quotation market in 1983, but increasingly turned to creating new lines of collectibles (rather than just facilitating exchanges between collectors).

The Bradford Group of companies, headquartered in Niles, Illinois, a suburb of Chicago, includes many groups of collectibles, including Ardleigh Elliott, Ashton-Drake Galleries, Bradford Editions, Bradford Exchange, Hamilton Authenticated, the Hamilton Collection and Hawthorne Village. Internationally, they have a presence in Canada, Australia, New Zealand, Germany, Switzerland, Austria, France, Italy, Sweden, Ireland and the Netherlands. 

Under the Ashton-Drake Galleries name they have sold dolls like Gene Marshall and Blythe as well as Reborn dolls.

In 2019, they released a coin through their mint commemorating the World War II victories in Europe and Japan which on the reverse included flags for the Allied Powers of America, France, and Great Britain, but left out the Soviet Union.

References

External links
The Bradford Exchange Official website

Design companies established in 1973
Niles, Illinois
Companies based in Cook County, Illinois
Doll manufacturing companies
Coin retailers
Toy companies of the United States
Retail companies established in 1973
Direct marketing
1973 establishments in Illinois
American companies established in 1973